As of 31 December 2013 Total S.A. (now TotalEnergies) had 898 subsidiaries consolidated into the group results, together with significant affiliate investments and joint ventures, mostly in LPG.  In addition Total had other significant equity holdings amounting to about 3bn euros, treated as investments and was involved in a number of significant joint ventures, mostly relating to LPG and LNG exploration, production and shipping.  The joint ventures that are treated as subsidiaries are listed in the consolidated subsidiary section.

Note: "E&P" stands for "exploration and production".


Main consolidated subsidiaries
 Abu Dhabi Gas Liquefaction Company Ltd (5.00%), United Arab Emirates
 Air Total International S.A., Switzerland
 Amyris Inc. (17.88%), United States
 Angola Block 14 B.V. (50.01%), Netherlands (operating in Angola)
 Angola LNG Limited (13.60%), Bermuda (operating in Angola)
 Arctic LNG 2 (10%), Russia
 , France
 Atlantic Trading & Marketing Inc., United States
 Atotech (China) Chemicals Ltd
 Atotech B.V., Netherlands
 Atotech Deutschland GmbH, Germany
 Atotech Taiwan
 BASF TOTAL Petrochemicals LLC (40.00%), United States
 Bostik Holding S.A., France
 Bostik Inc., United States
 Bostik Ltd, United Kingdom
 Bostik S.A., France
 Brass Holdings Company Limited, Luxembourg
 Brass LNG Ltd (17.00%), Nigeria
 Compagnie Pétrolière de l’Ouest - CPO, France
 Cos-Mar Company (50.00%), United States
 Cosden LLC, United States
 Cray Valley USA LLC, United States
 CSSA – Chartering and Shipping Services S.A., Switzerland
 Dalian West Pacific Petrochemical Co. Ltd (WEPEC) (22.41%), China
 Dolphin Energy Limited (24.50%), United Arab Emirates
 E. F. Oil And Gas Limited, United Kingdom
 Elf Aquitaine, France
 Elf Aquitaine Fertilisants, France
 Elf Aquitaine Inc., United States
 Elf Exploration Production, France
 Elf Exploration UK Limited, United Kingdom
 Elf Petroleum Iran, France (operating in Iran)
 Elf Petroleum UK Limited, United Kingdom
 Gaz Transport & Technigaz S.A.S. (30.00%), France
 Grande Paroisse S.A., France
 Hutchinson Argentina S.A.
 Hutchinson Autopartes De Mexico SA.DE. CV
 Hutchinson Corporation, United States
 Hutchinson Do Brasil S.A., Brazil
 Hutchinson GmbH, Germany
 Hutchinson Poland SP Z.O.O.
 Hutchinson S.A., France
 Ichthys LNG PTY Ltd (30.00%), Australia
 Legacy Site Services LLC, United States
 LSS Funding Inc., United States
 Naphtachimie (50.00%), France
 Nigeria LNG Ltd (15.00%)
 Novatek (16.96%), Russia
 Oman LNG LLC (5.54%)
 Omnium Reinsurance Company S.A., Switzerland
 Paulstra SNC, France
 PetroCedeño (30.32%), Venezuela
 Qatar Liquefied Gas Company Limited (II) Train B (16.70%)
 Qatar Petrochemical Company Q.S.C. (QAPCO) (20.00%)
 Qatargas Liquefied Gas Company Limited (10.00%)
 Qatofin Company Limited (49.09%), Qatar
 Samsung Total Petrochemicals Co. Ltd (50.00%), South Korea
 Saudi Aramco Total Refining and Petrochemical Company (37.50%), Saudi Arabia
 Shtokman Development AG (25.00%), Switzerland (operating in Russia)
 Sigmakalon Group B.V., Netherlands
 SOCAP S.A.S., France
 Société Anonyme de la Raffinerie des Antilles (50.00%), France
 Société Civile Immobilière CB2, France
 SOFAX Banque, France
 SunPower Corporation (64.65%), United States
 TOTAL (BTC) S.A.R.L., Luxembourg
 TOTAL Énergie Développement, France
 TOTAL Énergie Gaz, France
 TOTAL Énergies Nouvelles Activités USA, France
 TOTAL Austral, France (operating in Argentina)
 TOTAL Belgium
 TOTAL Capital, France
 TOTAL Capital Canada Ltd
 TOTAL Capital International, France
 TOTAL China Investment Co. Ltd
 TOTAL Coal South Africa (PTY) Ltd
 TOTAL Colombia Pipeline, France (operating in Colombia)
 TOTAL Delaware Inc., United States
 TOTAL Deutschland GmbH, Germany
 TOTAL Dolphin Midstream Limited, Bermuda
 TOTAL Downstream UK PLC, United Kingdom
 Total E&P Absheron B.V., Netherlands (operating in Azerbaijan)
 Total E&P Algerie, France (operating in Algeria)
 Total E&P Angola, France (operating in Angola)
 Total E&P Angola Block 15 / 06 Limited, Bermuda (operating in Angola)
 Total E&P Angola Block 17 / 06, France (operating in Angola)
 Total E&P Angola Block 25, France (operating in Angola)
 Total E&P Angola Block 32, France (operating in Angola)
 Total E&P Angola Block 33, France (operating in Angola)
 Total E&P Angola Block 39, France (operating in Angola)
 Total E&P Angola Block 40, France (operating in Angola)
 Total E&P Arctic Russia, France
 Total E&P Australia, France (operating in Australia)
 Total E&P Australia II, France (operating in Australia)
 Total E&P Australia III, France (operating in Australia)
 Total E&P Azerbaijan B.V., Netherlands (operating in Azerbaijan)
 Total E&P Bolivie, France (operating in Bolivia)
 Total E&P Borneo B.V., Netherlands (operating in Brunei)
 Total E&P Bulgaria B.V., The Netherlands (operating in Bulgaria)
 Total E&P Canada Ltd
 Total E&P Chine, France (operating in China)
 Total E&P Colombie, France (operating in Colombia)
 Total E&P Congo (85.00%)
 Total E&P Cyprus B.V., The Netherlands (operating in Cyprus)
 Total E&P Do Brasil LTDA, Brazil
 Total E&P Dolphin Upstream Limited, Bermuda (operating in Qatar)
 Total E&P France
 Total E&P Golfe Holdings Limited, Bermuda
 Total E&P Golfe Limited, United Arab (operating in Emirates Qatar)
 Total E&P Guyane Francaise, France
 Total E&P Holdings, France
 Total E&P Ichthys, France (operating in Australia)
 Total E&P Ichthys B.V., Netherlands (operating in Australia)
 Total E&P Indonesia West Papua, France (operating in Indonesia)
 Total E&P Indonesie, France (operating in Indonesia)
 Total E&P Iraq, France (operating in Iraq)
 Total E&P Italia, Italy
 Total E&P Kazakhstan, France (operating in Kazakhstan)
 Total E&P Kenya B.V., Netherlands (operating in Kenya)
 Total E&P Kurdistan Region of Iraq (Harir) B.V., Netherlands (operating in Iraq)
 Total E&P Kurdistan Region of Iraq (Safen) B.V., Netherlands (operating in Iraq)
 Total E&P Libye, France (operating in Libya)
 Total E&P Madagascar, France (operating in Madagascar)
 Total E&P Malaysia, France (operating in Malaysia)
 Total E&P Maroc, France (operating in Morocco)
 Total E&P Mauritanie, France (operating in Mauritania)
 Total E&P Mauritanie Block TA29 B.V., Netherlands (operating in Mauritania)
 Total E&P Mozambique B.V., Netherlands (operating in Mozambique)
 Total E&P Myanmar, France (operating in Myanmar)
 Total E&P Nederland B.V., Netherlands
 Total E&P Nigeria Deepwater D Limited
 Total E&P Nigeria Deepwater E Limited
 Total E&P Nigeria Ltd
 Total E&P Norge AS, Norway
 Total E&P Oman, France (operating in Oman)
 Total E&P Qatar, France (operating in Qatar)
 Total E&P Russie, France (operating in Russia)
 Total E&P South Africa B.V., Netherlands (operating in South Africa)
 Total E&P South East Mahakam, France (operating in Indonesia)
 Total E&P Syrie, France (operating in Syria)
 Total E&P Thailand, France (operating in Thailand)
 Total E&P Uganda B.V., Netherlands (operating in Uganda)
 Total E&P UK Limited, United Kingdom
 Total E&P Uruguay B.V., Netherlands (operating in Uruguay)
 Total E&P USA Inc., United States
 Total E&P Vietnam, France (operating in Vietnam)
 Total E&P Yamal, France
 Total E&P Yemen, France (operating in Yemen)
 TOTAL Especialidades Argentina
 TOTAL Exploration M’Bridge B.V., Netherlands (operating in Angola)
 TOTAL Exploration Production Nigeria, France
 TOTAL Finance, France
 TOTAL Finance Exploitation, France
 TOTAL Finance Global Services S.A., Belgium
 TOTAL Finance USA Inc., United States
 TOTAL Funding Nederland B.V., Netherlands
 TOTAL Gabon (58.28%)
 TOTAL Gas & Power Actifs Industriels, France
 TOTAL Gas & Power Limited, United Kingdom
 TOTAL Gas & Power North America Inc., United States
 TOTAL Gasandes, France
 TOTAL Gaz & Électricité Holdings France
 TOTAL Gestion Filiales, France
 TOTAL Gestion USA, France
 TOTAL GLNG Australia, France (operating in Australia)
 TOTAL Guinea Ecuatorial (80.00%), Equatorial Guinea
 TOTAL Holding Asie, France
 TOTAL Holding Dolphin Amont Limited, Bermuda
 TOTAL Holdings EUROPE, France
 TOTAL Holdings International B.V., Netherlands
 TOTAL Holdings Nederland B.V., Netherlands
 TOTAL Holdings UK Limited, United Kingdom
 TOTAL Holdings USA Inc., United States
 TOTAL International NV, Netherlands
 TOTAL Kenya (93.96%)
 TOTAL Lindsey Oil Refinery Ltd, United Kingdom
 TOTAL LNG Angola, France
 TOTAL LNG Nigeria Ltd, Bermuda
 TOTAL Lubrifiants (99.98%), France
 TOTAL Marketing Middle East Free Zone, United Arab Emirates
 TOTAL Marketing Services, France
 TOTAL Maroc, Morocco
 TOTAL Midstream Holdings UK Limited, United Kingdom
 TOTAL Mineraloel Und Chemie GmbH, Germany
 TOTAL Oil And Gas South America, France
 TOTAL Oil And Gas Venezuela B.V., Netherlands (operating in Venezuela)
 TOTAL Oil Turkiye AS, Turkey
 TOTAL Olefins Antwerp, Belgium
 TOTAL Outre-Mer, France
 TOTAL Participations Pétrolières Gabon
 TOTAL Petrochemicals & Refining S.A. / NV, Belgium
 TOTAL Petrochemicals & Refining USA Inc., United States
 TOTAL Petrochemicals France
 TOTAL Petroleum Angola, France (operating in Angola)
 TOTAL Profils Pétroliers, France
 TOTAL Qatar Oil And Gas, France
 TOTAL Raffinaderij Antwerpen NV, Belgium
 TOTAL Raffinage Chimie, France
 TOTAL Raffinage France
 TOTAL Raffinerie Mitteldeutschland GmbH, Germany
 TOTAL S.A., France
 TOTAL Shtokman B.V., Netherlands
 TOTAL South Africa (PTY) Ltd (50.10%)
 TOTAL Specialties USA Inc., United States
 TOTAL Treasury, France
 TOTAL UK Finance Ltd, United Kingdom
 TOTAL UK Limited, United Kingdom
 TOTAL Upstream Nigeria Limited
 TOTAL Upstream UK Limited, United Kingdom
 TOTAL Venezuela, France
 TOTAL Vostok, Russia
 TOTAL Yemen LNG Company Limited, Bermuda
 TotalErg SPA (49.00%), Italy
 TOTSA Total Oil Trading S.A., Switzerland
 Yamal LNG (33.59%), Russia
 Yemen LNG Company Ltd (39.62%), Bermuda (operating in Yemen)
 Zeeland Refinery N.V. (55.00%), Netherlands

References

TotalEnergies
Lists of corporate subsidiaries